Shane Golden (born 1991) is an Irish hurler who plays for Clare Senior Championship club Sixmilebridge and at inter-county level with the Clare senior hurling team. He usually lines out at midfield.

Honours

Sixmilebridge
Clare Senior Hurling Championship (4): 2013, 2015, 2017, 2019

Clare
National Hurling League (1): 2016
All-Ireland Under-21 Hurling Championship (1): 2012
Munster Under-21 Hurling Championship (1): 2012

References

1991 births
Living people
Sixmilebridge hurlers
Clare inter-county hurlers